Akbar Moideen Thumbay is the Vice-President of the Healthcare Division of Thumbay Group, a diversified international business conglomerate headquartered at DIFC, Dubai - UAE.  He is also a member of the ‘Thumbay Group Board’, a five-member board which implements Thumbay Group's strategic plans.

Early life and education 
Akbar Moideen Thumbay was born on 18 March 1984 to Thumbay Moideen, a third generation business entrepreneur and Zohra, an accomplished artist from Mangalore, India.

As a child he would accompany his grandfather, B. Ahmed Hajee Mohiudeen, Founder Chairman of the BA Group in Mangalore, India. He completed his secondary education from The Lawrence School, Lovedale, Ooty. After moving to the United Arab Emirates (UAE) at the age of 15, he continued his studies at the International School of Choueifat. He completed his graduation in Mechanical Engineering from the American University of Sharjah (AUS). Later, he went on to continue his postgraduate studies in Hospital Management from the SDA Boccioni School of Management in Milan, Italy.

Career 
After completing his studies, Akbar spent the first few months with a New York-based company. Later he joined Thumbay Group on a full-time basis, and came to grips with the regular operations and day-to-day challenges of the organization. His first business assignment was to build an effective set of websites for his father’s Thumbay Group of companies. Later he was made manager of the Thumbay Healthcare and Retail divisions, and subsequently the Director of Healthcare and Retail at Thumbay Group, with responsibility of managing the two Divisions. He became the Vice-President of the Healthcare Division on 1 November 2015.

The Healthcare Division deals with the operations of its Thumbay Hospitals in Ajman, Fujairah, Sharjah, Dubaiaand Hyderabad - India,s well as the Thumbay Clinics and Thumbay Labs. Under the banner of the Retail Division, he initiated Nutri Plus Vita, a series of health nutrition and wellness stores, while handling the brands of Zo & Mo Opticals and Thumbay Pharmacy located across the UAE.

Over the years, Thumbay Hospitals  has become one of the largest healthcare providers in the UAE's private healthcare sector. The hospitals’ treat more than 2,500 patients from over 175 nationalities on a daily basis, for treatments from check-ups to surgeries. One of Akbar’s key initiatives has been to promote Thumbay Hospitals in the medical tourism segment in an aggressive manner.

Akbar is also credited as being the brain behind the Thumbay Marketing and Distribution Company (TMDC), which focuses on being an organization for marketing and distributing various products in the UAE.

Awards, recognitions and achievements 

Akbar was featured in the list '40 And Under: The Region's Most Influential Young Business Leaders' published by Arabian Business, in 2018. He was recognized as Young Leader ‘Shaping the Future’ at Stars of Business Leadership Awards 2017. He was honored with the ‘Champion of Change’ Award at the 7th Annual MENA HR Excellence Awards 2015 in recognition of his leadership, strategic thinking and key management decisions that benefited the organization. He was also featured in the twenty five young Business Leaders in UAE, profiled in a coffee table book GEN NEXT INDIANS. In recognition of his merit and professional accomplishments, Akbar was inducted into the Alumni Wall of Fame of his alma mater, the American University of Sharjah (AUS).

He also received the award for Thumbay Hospital being featured as the Best Medical Tourism Hospital in the Middle-East by The New Economy, a leading newspaper in the UK, in 2013.

Akbar has spoken at various conferences and seminars held in the Middle-East and Europe, which includes: 
 The Harvard Crossroads Summer Program in Dubai, on 14 August 2017.
 The "International Medical Travel Exhibition and Conference" held in Oman in April 2013.
 The "Borderlines in Healthcare" event in May 2014 in Austria.
 Invited as speaker at Mohammed bin Rashid School of Government for the Leadership & Entrepreneurship Series 2016.
 Invited as speaker at AUS Enterprising Youth Forum at the American University of Sharjah in April 2016.
Akbar was a team member in the AUS Engineering Team that built an FSAE race car that would later race in the United States. The highlight of his course was the internship he undertook at Mercedes Benz Headquarters in Berlin, Germany.

Other Activities 
Akbar is the owner of the cricket team "Thumbay Kasargod Leopards" at Kerala Cricket League, UAE.

Family 
Akbar’s father,  Dr. Thumbay Moideen is the Founder President of Thumbay Group, and his mother is  Zohra Moideen. Akbar is married to  Nousheen Salma, and they have three sons, Ahmed, Omar and Rashid. Nousheen Salma is in charge of handling the editorial and design advice of ‘Health’ magazine, Thumbay Group’s health and lifestyle publication.  Akbar’s younger brother, Akram Moideen Thumbay is the Director of Operations, Construction & Renovation Division of Thumbay Group and Director of Thumbay Technologies.

References

External links 

 https://ae.linkedin.com/pub/akbar-moideen-thumbay/7/361/8b1

Living people
1984 births
Businesspeople from Karnataka